José Clebson Augustinho, or simply Kell (born March 20, 1980 in Natal), is a Brazilian defensive midfielder. He currently plays for Santa Cruz-RN.

Honours
Ceará State League: 2003

Contract
7 January 2008 to 7 April 2008

External links
 CBF

1980 births
Living people
People from Natal, Rio Grande do Norte
Brazilian footballers
Fortaleza Esporte Clube players
Clube de Regatas Brasil players
Shenzhen F.C. players
Avaí FC players
Joinville Esporte Clube players
Guarani FC players
Club Athletico Paranaense players
Association football midfielders
Sportspeople from Rio Grande do Norte